Sam Hartman (born July 29, 1999) is an American football quarterback who plays college football for Notre Dame. He formerly played for the Wake Forest Demon Deacons where he became the ACC all-time leader in touchdown passes.

Early life and high school career
Hartman was born on July 29, 1999, in Charlotte, North Carolina. Hartman attended Davidson Day School in Charlotte before transferring to Oceanside Collegiate Academy in Mount Pleasant, South Carolina, where he was a team captain at quarterback. In his sophomore and junior seasons at Davidson Day, Hartman threw for 6,388 passing yards and 69 touchdowns, being named first-team all-state as a junior and was given the Charlotte Observer player of the week award four times. He also had a game with 563 passing yards, third-highest in county history.

He transferred to Oceanside for his senior season, and led them to a 7–3 record while throwing for 3,093 yards passing and 29 touchdowns, in addition to nine rushing scores. Hartman was rated the No. 12 pro-style passer in the class of 2018 by 247Sports.com and was a three-star recruit. He was featured in the documentary series QB1: Beyond the Lights for his final season in high school.

College career

Wake Forest
Hartman accepted a scholarship offer from Wake Forest University, and won the starting quarterback position in preseason camp. He started the season opener against Tulane, and was one of five freshman quarterbacks to start the season in the NCAA Division I Football Bowl Subdivision. He was 31-for-51 passing against Tulane, throwing for 378 yards and leading them to a win in overtime. He was the first true freshman to start the season-opener as a quarterback in school history. Through the first three games of the season, Hartman led all freshmen in the country for yards of offense and made two or more touchdown passes in each game. He was named ACC Conference rookie of the week following a win on September 29 versus Rice, in which he tied the school record for consecutive completions with 12. He led them to a 4–4 record before suffering an injury against Syracuse that kept him out for the rest of the season.

After an extensive competition throughout the spring and fall camp, Hartman was the backup quarterback as a sophomore in 2019 behind Jamie Newman, only appearing in four games, thus preserving a redshirt for the season. He saw his first action of the season against Louisville on October 12, when he took over in the fourth quarter trailing 38–55. Hartman led them to three-straight scoring drives, as they lost 59–62. He was named starter prior to their next game versus Florida State, and led Wake Forest to a 22–20 victory. He next saw playing time late in the year versus Syracuse, playing from the second to fourth quarters. He threw two passes in the season finale, a loss to Michigan State in the 2019 Pinstripe Bowl.

He regained a starting position as a redshirt-sophomore in 2020, being named team captain and playing in all nine games. Against North Carolina, Hartman compiled 429 passing yards and four touchdown passes in the 53–59 loss. He finished the season ranked 28th nationally with 2,224 passing yards. Due to extensive disruption to college football caused by the COVID-19 pandemic, the NCAA ruled that the 2020–21 school year would not be counted against the eligibility of any football player.

In 2021, Hartman led his team to an 8–0 start, the best in school history. He earned national honors following a game against Army, in which Hartman compiled a career-best 458 passing yards and five touchdowns. He was named the Davey O'Brien National Quarterback of the Week, PFF National Offensive Player of the Week, Maxwell Award Player of the Week, and CFPA national performer of the week. He set several Wake Forest single-season records, including 39 touchdown passes and 4,228 passing yards.

Notre Dame
On January 5, 2023, Hartman announced his intent to transfer to Notre Dame.

College statistics

References

External links

Wake Forest bio

1999 births
Living people
Players of American football from Charlotte, North Carolina
American football quarterbacks
Wake Forest Demon Deacons football players
Notre Dame Fighting Irish football players